Laura Milani (born 30 September 1984 in Milan) is an Italian rower.

References

External links
 

1984 births
Living people
Italian female rowers
Rowers from Milan
Rowers at the 2016 Summer Olympics
Olympic rowers of Italy
World Rowing Championships medalists for Italy
Mediterranean Games silver medalists for Italy
Mediterranean Games medalists in rowing
Competitors at the 2013 Mediterranean Games
Rowers of Fiamme Gialle
European Rowing Championships medalists